The provincial level administrative divisions are the highest-level administrative divisions of China. There are 34 such divisions claimed by the People's Republic of China, classified as 23 provinces, five autonomous regions, four municipalities and two special administrative regions. The political status of Taiwan Province along with a small fraction of Fujian Province remain in dispute; those are under separate rule by the Republic of China, which is usually referred to as "Taiwan".

Every province on Mainland China (including the island province of Hainan) has a Chinese Communist Party (CCP) provincial committee, headed by a secretary. The Committee Secretary is effectively in charge of the province, rather than the governor of the provincial government. The same arrangement exists for the autonomous regions and municipalities.

Types of provincial level divisions

Province 
The government of each standard province is nominally led by a provincial committee, headed by a secretary. The committee secretary is first-in-charge of the province; second-in-command is the governor of the provincial government. In practice, day-to-day affairs are managed by a provincial party standing committee, which makes decisions for a province analogous to the Politburo for the central government.

The People's Republic of China (PRC) claims the island of Taiwan and its surrounding islets, including Penghu, as "Taiwan Province", though Taiwan has not been under control of a government that ruled from mainland China since 1949, when the Republic of China (ROC) lost the mainland to the CCP, which established the PRC. (Kinmen and the Matsu Islands are claimed by the PRC as part of its Fujian Province. Pratas Island and the Vereker Banks and Itu Aba (Taiping Island) are claimed by the PRC as part of Guangdong and Hainan provinces respectively.) The territory is controlled by the Republic of China (ROC, commonly called "Taiwan") though the provinces were streamlined in 1998 and the provincial governments were de facto dissolved in 2019.

Municipality

A municipality or municipality directly under the administration of the central government is a higher level of city which is directly under the Chinese government, with status equal to that of the provinces. In practice, their political status is higher than that of common provinces. 

During the Republican era, these were called "Yuan-controlled municipalities" but these were renamed to simply "special municipality" in 1994. All six of the ROC-controlled special municipalities are claimed and classified by the PRC as prefectural-level cities under Taiwan Province.

Autonomous region 

An autonomous region is a minority subject which has a higher population of a particular minority ethnic group along with its own local government, but an autonomous region theoretically has more legislative rights than in actual practice. The governor of each autonomous region is usually appointed from the respective minority ethnic group.

Special administrative region (SAR) 

A special administrative region (SAR) is a highly autonomous and self-governing sub national subject of the People's Republic of China that is directly under the Central People's Government. Each SAR has a chief executive as head of the region and head of government. The region's government is not fully independent, as foreign policy and military defence are the responsibility of the central government, according to the basic laws.

List of provincial level divisions

History

Han provinces 
The names of the provinces that the Eastern (Later) Han created were Bing, Ji, Jiao, Jing, Liang (at first Yong, later changed to Liang), Qing, Si (the Sili Xiaowei Department), Xu, Yan, Yang, Yi, You and 
Yu. The capital, Luoyang, was in the Si province, as was the former capital, Chang An.

Sui provinces 

By the time unity was finally reestablished by the Sui dynasty, the provinces had been divided and redivided so many times by different governments that they were almost the same size as commanderies, rendering the two-tier system superfluous. As such, the Sui merged the two together. In English, this merged level is translated as "prefectures". In Chinese, the name changed between zhou and jun several times before being finally settled on zhou. Based on the apocryphal Nine Province system, the Sui restored nine zhou.

Tang provinces 

Emperor Taizong (r. 626–649) set up 10 "circuits" in 627 as inspection areas for imperial commissioners monitoring the operation of prefectures, rather than a new primary level of administration. In 639, there were 10 circuits, 43 commanderies, and 358 prefectures ( and later ). In 733, Emperor Xuanzong expanded the number of circuits to 15 by establishing separate circuits for the areas around Chang'an and Luoyang, and by splitting the large Shannan and Jiangnan circuits into 2 and 3 new circuits respectively. He also established a system of permanent inspecting commissioners, though without executive powers.

* Circuits established under Xuanzong, as opposed to Taizong's original ten circuits.

** Circuits established under Xuanzong by dividing Taizong's Jiangnan and Shannan circuits.

Other Tang-era circuits include the West Lingnan, Wu'an, and Qinhua circuits.

Song provinces 

The Song government abolished the previous commissioners and renamed their circuits (literally meaning "roads", but is still usually translated as "circuits"). They also added a number of "army" prefectures. Similarly, Liao and Jurchen Jin dynasties also established circuits as the first-level administrative division.

Yuan provinces 

China was reorganised into 11 provinces keeping most of the previous boundaries of provinces created by the previous dynasty unchanged, the Yuan dynasty (1271–1368) had two additional regions: Central region ruled by the Zhongshu Sheng and the Tibetan region ruled by the Bureau of Buddhist and Tibetan Affairs.

Ming provinces

The Ming dynasty (1368–1644) kept the province system set up by the Yuan dynasty. However, it divided the original 10 provinces into 16, later two capital metropolitan areas and 13 provinces within China proper and five additional military-ruled regions.

Qing provinces 

By the latter half of the Qing dynasty (1644–1912), there were 18 provinces, all of them in China proper.
Jiangsu and Anhui were originally one province called Jiangnan, with its capital at Nanjing. There was no discrete time period when the two halves of Jiangnan were split, but rather, this was a gradual process.

New provinces 
 Xinjiang 1884–1912
 Taiwan 1885–1895
 Fengtian 1907–1912
 Jilin 1907–1912
 Heilongjiang 1907–1912

Each province had a xunfu (translated as "governor"), a political overseer on behalf of the emperor, and a tidu (translated as "captain general"), a military governor. In addition, there was a zongdu, a general military inspector or governor general, for every two to three provinces.

Outer regions of China (those beyond China proper) were not divided into provinces. Military leaders or generals oversaw Manchuria (consisting of Fengtian (now Liaoning), Jilin, Heilongjiang), Xinjiang, and Mongolia, while vice-dutong and civilian leaders headed the leagues, a subdivision of Mongolia. The ambans supervised the administration of Tibet.

In 1884 Xinjiang became a province; in 1907 Fengtian, Jilin, and Heilongjiang were made provinces as well. Taiwan became a province in 1885, but China ceded Taiwan to Japan in 1895. As a result, there were 22 provinces in China (Outer China and China proper) near the end of the Qing dynasty.

ROC provinces

 
The Republic of China, established in 1912, set up four more provinces in Inner Mongolia and two provinces in historic Tibet, bringing the total to 28. In 1931, Ma Zhongying established Hexi in the northern parts of Gansu but the ROC never acknowledged the province. However, China lost four provinces with the establishment of the Japanese puppet state of Manchukuo in Manchuria. After the defeat of Japan in World War II in 1945, China re-incorporated Manchuria as 10 provinces, and assumed control of Taiwan as a province. As a result, the Republic of China in 1946 had 35 provinces. 

Although the Republic of China now only controls one province (Taiwan), and some islands of a second province (Fujian), it continues to formally claim all 35 provinces (including those that no longer form part of the area of the People's Republic of China) in official maps by the ROC government and ignores the changes imposed by the PRC. By 1967 and 1979, the ROC set up Taipei and Kaohsiung as its special municipalities, with three more added in 2010 and one in 2014. No boundary changes were redrawn as of  but the Chen Shui-bian administration renounced claims to Outer Mongolia in 2002. The remaining provinces became streamlined in 1998 and its governments became non-functional in 2019.

Other provincial level divisions

List of PRC/ROC provincial level divisions

Greater administrative areas

Provinces

Autonomous regions

Municipalities

Special administrative regions

Administrative territories

Regions

Territories 

The People's Republic of China abolished many of the provinces in the 1950s and converted a number of them into autonomous regions. Hainan became a separate province in 1988, bringing the total number of provinces under PRC control to 22.

In contrast, the Republic of China also had a number of provinces under its control such as Taiwan and Fujian, which the ROC currently administers, though the ROC abolished the Xinjiang Provincial Office in 1992. In 1998, after streamlining of the two provinces, some of its powers from the Taiwan and Fujian Provincial Governments were gradually transferred to county governments. This fractured further between 2018 and 2019 when the ROC central government de facto abolished the provincial governments with most of the remaining powers given to the Executive Yuan.

Economies 
The provinces in southeast coastal area of China such as Jiangsu, Zhejiang, Fujian and (mainly) Guangdong tend to be more industrialized, with regions in the hinterland less developed.

See also 

 Federalism in China
 List of Chinese administrative divisions by GDP
 List of Chinese administrative divisions by population
 List of current Chinese provincial leaders
 Regional discrimination in China
 Taiwan Province, People's Republic of China
 Tiao-kuai
 Yangtze Delta
 Zhou (country subdivision)

Notes

References

External links 

 Interactive Dbresearch.com: WebMap  — with economic indicators for all Chinese Provinces.

 
 

Administrative divisions of China
Subdivisions of Taiwan
Provinces, China